Buller High School is a secondary school in the town of Westport, New Zealand. The school has a roll of over 360 students, all Year 9 and above. As well as students from Westport, the school has a large number of students from nearby towns that do not have high schools of their own, such as Waimangaroa, Granity,  and Seddonville. The school was founded in 1922, although has ties to earlier secondary schooling in the Buller district.

References

External links 
 

Westport, New Zealand
Secondary schools in the West Coast, New Zealand